Barjak may refer to:

 Barjak, Hamadan, a village in Iran
 Barjak, Kerman, a village in Iran
 Oshtro Koplje, also known as Barjak, a mountain peak in Kosovo
 Bajrak, also known as Barjak, an Ottoman territorial unit type
 Borjak-e Seyfollah, also known as Barjak, a village in Kerman Province, Iran

See also
 
 Borjak (disambiguation)
 Barjok (disambiguation)